Streptomyces amakusaensis is a bacterium species from the genus of Streptomyces which has been isolated from soil from the Amakusa Island in Japan. Streptomyces amakusaensis produces tuberin and nagstatin.

See also 
 List of Streptomyces species

References

Further reading

External links
Type strain of Streptomyces amakusaensis at BacDive – the Bacterial Diversity Metadatabase

amakusaensis
Bacteria described in 1963